Bismarck Veliz (born 10 September 1993) is a Nicaraguan footballer who plays for Chinandega FC.

References

1993 births
Living people
Nicaraguan men's footballers
Nicaragua international footballers
Association football defenders
2017 Copa Centroamericana players
2017 CONCACAF Gold Cup players
Chinandega FC players
Deportivo Ocotal players
Juventus Managua players
Managua F.C. players
Real Estelí F.C. players
People from Chinandega